Kesaibahal is a village in Sambalpur district, Odisha, India. It is also one of the panchayat of Bamra block. The name Kesaibahal is of historical origins, where the Raja of erstwhile Bamanda state was awarded with the title of Knight Commandent of Indian Empire, by the British, thus the name KCIE of the land leading to the name Kesaibahal. Its geographical coordinates are 21° 55' 0" North, 84° 23' 0" East.

Notable people 
1. Mitrabhanu Gauntia

Facilities 
Compared to other nearby villages, Kesaibahal is a developed village. It has the following facilities:
 State Bank of India, Ifsc-code SBIN0009352.
 Gram panchayat
 Primary health centre for the purpose of treatment of nearby peoples.
 Kesaibahal Panchayat High School
 P.D.R College Kesaibahal
 B.G.Degree College
 Post office having Pin code 768228
 GREMS, Kesaibahal, English Medium Residential School
 Shree Automobiles, ARD Hero Moto Corp
 Mahindra showroom, rice plant transmissions 
 Sajan cloth store 
 M/S- Shruti Enterprises 
 Connectivity to all the main roads.

Sambalpur district

Villages in Sambalpur district